James Nash State High School is an independent coeducational public secondary school located in Gympie in the Wide Bay–Burnett region in Queensland, Australia. The school has a total enrolment of more than 1200 students each year, with an official count of 1220 students in 2017.

James Nash State High School's current role of Principal is held by Jackson Dodd. The school also consists of more than 110 other staff members including four Deputy Principals, one Business Manager, one Guidance Officer, one School Chaplain, 12 Heads of Department and 98 teaching staff.

History

James Nash State High School officially opened on 24 January 1977 and was named in honour of James Nash (5 September 1834 – 5 October 1913), who discovered the Gympie Goldfield on 16 October 1867.

In 2013, James Nash State High School received a Queensland Showcase Award for Excellence in Education.

Sporting houses

James Nash State High School includes the following four sporting houses, all of which are named in reference to gold mines worked on the Gympie Goldfield, with their respective colours:

Curriculum

English

English is a compulsory core subject taught across the Year 7–10 curriculum. Students in Year 10 undertake the subjects of General English, General English Extension or Essential English. Students in Years 11 & 12 undertaking English study the General subjects of General English, Cyber English or General English Extension (Year 12 only), or the Applied subject of Essential English.

Mathematics

Mathematics is a compulsory core subject taught across the Year 7–10 curriculum. Students in Year 10 undertake either General Mathematics or Specialist Mathematics. Years 11 and 12 students undertaking Mathematics study the General subjects of Mathematics, Mathematical Methods or Specialist Mathematics, or the Applied subject of Essential Mathematics.

Social Sciences

Social Sciences is a compulsory core subject that is taught in the subjects of History, Geography and Civics across the Year 7–9 curriculum. In Year 10, Social Sciences remains a compulsory subject and each student undertakes one of the subjects of Ancient History, Geography, Legal Studies and Modern History. Social Sciences subjects available to Years 11 and 12 students include the General subjects of Accounting, Ancient History, Business, Economics, Geography and Legal Studies, and the Applied subject of Social & Community Studies.

Science

Science is a compulsory core subject across the Year 7–10 curriculum. Students in Year 10 undertake either General Science or Specialist Science. Science subjects available to Years 11 and 12 students include the General subjects of Biology, Chemistry and Physics, and the Applied subject of Science in Practice.

Health & Physical Education

Health & Physical Education is a compulsory core subject across the Year 7–9 curriculum. In Year 10, Health & Physical Education becomes an elective subject and students undertaking Health & Physical Education study either of the subjects of Physical Education and Recreation Studies. Health & Physical Education subjects available to Years 11 and 12 students include the General subject of Physical Education and the Applied subjects of General Sport & Recreation and Outdoor Sport & Recreation.

German

German is the Languages Other Than English subject taught at James Nash State High School. It is a compulsory subject for students in Years 7–8 and an elective subject for students in Years 9–12.

The Arts

Years 7 and 8 students rotate through the Arts subjects of Art, Drama and Music over the two-year period. Year 9 students study the same subjects as semester-long elective subjects. In Year 10, students have opportunities to participate in the elective subjects of Drama, Music, Practical Art and Visual Art. Arts subjects available to Years 11 and 12 students include the General subjects of Drama, Music and Visual Art, and the Applied subjects of Drama in Practice and Visual Arts in Practice.

Business & Digital Technologies

Business & Digital Technologies is a rotational subject for students in Years 7 and 8. Business & Digital Technologies subjects available to students in Years 9 and 10 include Business Information Processing, Digital Technologies and Economics & Business. Year 10 students undertaking Business Information Processing achieve a Certificate I in Business.

Design & Technology

Years 7 and 8 students rotate through the Design & Technology subjects of Design Technology and Home Economics over the two-year period. Students in Year 9 study the Design & Technology subjects of Food & Nutrition, Graphics, Metal Production, Wood Production and Textiles Technology as semester-long elective subjects. In Year 10, the Design & Technology subjects of Certificate I in Construction (CPC10111), Certificate I in Hospitality (SIT10216), Graphics, Fashion Studies, Food & Nutrition, Metal Production and Wood Production are studied as elective subjects for the full year. Design & Technology subjects available to Years 11 and 12 students include the General subjects of Design, Digital Solutions and Food & Nutrition, and the Applied subjects of Building & Construction Skills, Engineering Skills, Fashion, Hospitality Practices, Industrial Graphics Skills and Industrial Technology Skills.

Vocational Education & Training

James Nash State High School offers the following Vocational Education & Training (VET) courses to students in Years 11 & 12:

 Certificate I in Hospitality (SIT10216)
 Certificate II in Business (BSB20115)
 Certificate II in Hospitality (SIT20316)
 Certificate II in Information, Digital Media & Technology (ICT20115)
 Certificate II in Skills for Work and Vocational Pathways (FSK20113)
 Certificate II in Sport & Recreation (SIS20115)
 Certificate II in Tourism (SIT20116)
 Certificate III in Tourism (SIT30116)

Co-curricular activities

 ACA Intenstive
 AIME Mentoring Program
 Annual Musical excursion
 Assisting Gympie West Cross Country & Athletics
 ASX Sharemarket Game
 Athletics
 Australian Maths Competition
 Breakfast Program
 Brisbane Show school band performances
 Brisbane theatre excursion
 Community concerts for primary schools and aged care facilities
 Cooloola Gallery exhibition of student works
 Cooloola Maths Teams Challenge
 Creative Writing and Science Excellence programs
 Cross Country
 Cultural appreciation activities
 Driver Education Programs
 Fanfare Competition
 Futsal – Bill Turner Cup
 Gallery of Modern Art, Brisbane excursion
 Girls' AFL
 Gold Rush Parade
 Green City Challenge
 Gympie Eisteddfod
 Gympie gallery excursions
 Gympie Heart of Gold Short Film Festival
 Gympie Regional Careers Expo
 Gympie Show school band performances
 Hope Reins
 Human Powered Vehicles Challenge
 IM camp
 Inter-school hockey, netball and Rugby League
 JACA Showcase Event
 JN Chess Club
 Mathletics
 Minister's Awards for Art Education competition
 Music Performance Evening
 Muster
 National Chemistry Quiz
 Noosa Jazz Festival
 On the Right Track Program
 Peer Skills Program
 Public speaking
 Lions Youth of the Year
 Plain English Speaking Competition
 RACI National Chemistry Quiz
 Rock and Water
 Saving Lives Program
 Science and Engineering Challenge
 Science, Engineering and Technology Expo
 Science ICAS Competition
 Science Investigation Awards
 Sunshine Coast Rugby Union Competition
 Swimming
 Tennis
 Tin Can Bay Gala Sports Day
 Tournament of Minds
 Triathlon
 Vicki Wilson Cup Netball
 Whole School Musical Production
 Wide Bay volleyball championships
 Year 12 Senior Conference

Extracurricular activities

Clubs and societies

 Academy of Creative Arts (ACA)
 Art activities
 Chess Club
 Crochet Group
 Makerspace
 Structured Learning Gardening Club
 Study Group
 Volleyball
 Year 7 Gardening Club

Sports

Inter-school sports competitions are available for AFL, Hockey, Netball, Rugby League, Rugby Union and Soccer.

Students have an ability to make representative regional teams in the following sports:

 AFL
 Basketball
 Cricket
 Golf
 Hockey
 Netball
 Rugby League
 Rugby Union
 Soccer
 Squash
 Softball
 Tennis
 Touch Football
 Volleyball

Annual Sports Carnivals are held for Swimming, Cross Country and Athletics. These carnivals are the base for James Nash State High School's four representative houses to vie for the ‘James Nash House Cup’.

References

External links
 

Public high schools in Queensland
Gympie
Schools in Wide Bay–Burnett
Educational institutions established in 1977
1977 establishments in Australia